HSwMS Gripen (Gr), was the second boat of the Draken-class submarine of the Swedish Navy.

Construction and career 
HSwMS Gripen was launched on 31 May 1960 by Karlskronavarvet, Karlskrona and commissioned on 28 April 1962.

She was decommissioned in 1982 and scrapped in 1989.

Gallery

References 

Draken-class submarines
Ships built in Karlskrona
1960 ships